Rotello is a comune (municipality) in the Province of Campobasso in the Italian region Molise, located about  northeast of Campobasso.

Rotello borders the following municipalities: Montelongo, Montorio nei Frentani, San Martino in Pensilis, Santa Croce di Magliano, Serracapriola, Torremaggiore, and Ururi.

Transportation 
Rotello was served by a railway station, the Ururi-Rotello railway station, on the Termoli-Campobasso and Termoli–Venafro lines.  However, the station has been closed for a few years and currently does not have passenger service.

References

Cities and towns in Molise